The elegant or blue-hooded euphonia (Chlorophonia elegantissima) is a species of bird in the family Fringillidae. It is found in Belize, Costa Rica, El Salvador, Guatemala, Honduras, Mexico, Nicaragua, and Panama. It was formerly classified in the genus Euphonia, but phylogenetic evidence indicates that it groups with Chlorophonia.

Its natural habitats are subtropical or tropical moist montane forest and heavily degraded former forest.

References

External links 
 Photo; Article, Photo gallery-"Blue-hooded Euphonia" 
 Euphonia elegantissima--"Elegant Euphonia" photo gallery VIREO Photo-High Res

elegant euphonia
Birds of Central America
Birds of Mexico
elegant euphonia
elegant euphonia
Taxonomy articles created by Polbot
Birds of the Sierra Madre Occidental
Birds of the Sierra Madre Oriental
Birds of the Sierra Madre del Sur
Birds of the Trans-Mexican Volcanic Belt
Taxobox binomials not recognized by IUCN